Somatochlora, or the striped emeralds, is a genus of dragonflies in the family Corduliidae with 42 described species found across the Northern Hemisphere.

Taxonomy
The name Somatochlora is derived from the Greek soma (body) and khloros (green). The species Corduliochlora borisi was formerly treated as a member of Somatochlora.

Description

Members of this genus are medium-sized dragonflies with dark bodies and a metallic green lustre. The eyes are brilliant green, and many species have dull to bright yellow markings on the thorax and/or abdomen. The abdomens of males are distinctive, with the first two segments bulbous-shaped, the third constricted, and the rest of the abdomen club-shaped with a straight ending. Females have abdomens with straighter sides. Identifying these dragonflies to species can be difficult. The cerci of males, on the tip of the abdomen, are distinctively shaped in each species, as are the subgenital plates on female abdomens. In some species, the subgenital plate is large and projecting, and is used as a "pseudo-ovipositor" for inserting eggs into a substrate.

Distribution

Somatochlora species are found across the Northern Hemisphere in Europe, Asia, and North America, with some species extending into arctic regions north of the treeline. Some species extend south to Spain, Turkey, northern India, northern Vietnam, Taiwan and the Southern United States. In North America, most species live in the boreal forest and/or the Appalachian Mountains.

Life historySomatochlora larvae typically live in bogs, fens, and/or forest streams, with some species found in lakes. They do not occur in marshy ponds. Many species are limited to very specific habitats and are rare and local. Adults feed in flight and may occur at some distance from their breeding habitat in mixed swarms.

SpeciesSomatochlora is the most diverse group within the Corduliidae. Of the 42 described species listed below, 25 are North American, 16 are Eurasian, and one is circumboreal (S. sahlbergi). Two additional fossil species have been assigned to this genus: S. brisaci, based on a wing from the Upper Miocene in France, and S. oregonica'', based on two wings from the Oligocene in Oregon.

References

Corduliidae
Anisoptera genera
Taxa named by Edmond de Sélys Longchamps